Maragua Constituency is an electoral constituency in Kenya. It is one of seven constituencies in Muranga County. It was one of three constituencies in the former Maragua District, Central Province. The constituency was established for the 1997 elections.

Members of Parliament

Wards

References 

Constituencies in Murang'a County
Constituencies in Central Province (Kenya)
1997 establishments in Kenya
Constituencies established in 1997